Alejandro Barrenechea (born 30 March 1976) is a Spanish gymnast. He competed at the 2000 Summer Olympics and the 2004 Summer Olympics.

References

1976 births
Living people
Spanish male artistic gymnasts
Olympic gymnasts of Spain
Gymnasts at the 2000 Summer Olympics
Gymnasts at the 2004 Summer Olympics
Sportspeople from Bilbao
Gymnasts from the Basque Country (autonomous community)